U-N-I (short for "U-N-I To The Verse") are a hip hop duo from Inglewood, Los Angeles, consisting of Y-O (born Yonas Semere Michael) and Thurzday (born Yannick Koffi).

History
Y-O and Thurzday met in 1999 at St. Bernard High School in Westchester, California. They were originally part of a four-man group, the Rap-Ture Kamp, along with fellow St. Bernard student Ablaze and local producer Unjust Ant. This crew released two mixtapes, Rap-Ture Kamp Unleash, Volume 1 and Jacking Beats. After graduation in 2006 they split from the Kamp and formed U-N-I, the name inspired by The Roots' 1996 album Illadelph Halflife. Thurz stated "To us, it's a first person statement. Myself and Y-O, U-N-I-verse, ain't nobody against us. It also stands for being universal and not being boxed into one sound."

Y-O is the mohawk emcee whose name "Yonas" translates to "Soldier" in his native Ethiopian and he moved from Seattle, Washington to Inglewood, California in 1996. Thurzday is a descendant of both Côte d'Ivoire and Belize, taking his moniker from his last name "Koffi" which translates in Ghana's native language of Akan to "boy born on Friday."

2007-2008
U-N-I who profess to be die hard sneaker aficionados flipped The Wu-Tang Clan's "C.R.E.A.M" into the 2007 hit song "K.R.E.A.M." (Kicks Rule Everything Around Me) which to date has received 430,000 hits on YouTube. That same year the duo released their satirically titled street album Fried Chicken & Watermelon which contained 14 songs including the single "Beautiful Day" and "Phat Girls," an ode to bigger women. “Beautiful Day” has received over 1.2 million views on YouTube, and garnered international acclaim from as far as the Czech Republic, Belgium and Germany.  The duo soon became a staple on the urban and alternative blogosphere and received 5.5 million profile views on Myspace. Subsequently, they were signed by ICM Agency and opened up for artists including Lupe Fiasco, 50 Cent, Mos Def, Talib Kweli, Wale, Ludacris, Busta Rhymes, The Roots and Redman. They were named "Best Breakout LA Artist" at the 2008 MTV Video Music Awards, featured in URB Magazine's “NEXT 100” & “NEXT 1000,” XXL Magazine's “New Kids in Town,” Billboard Magazine's “Acts to Watch,” The Source Magazine's “Unsigned Hype” & “Off the Radar,” Time Out New York's “The Volume,” MTVu's “The Hot Seat,” BET.com's “Rookies of the Year” and ending up on the “SoundBoard” of The Los Angeles Times while serving as the official hosts of MTV's “Sucka Free” - on the strength of their observant, life-affirming rhymes that revolved around everything from limited-edition sneakers to cosmic existentialism and old-school video games to musings on life and actress Lauren London.

In October 2008 their rendition of "Stakes is High" was featured on The Honor Roll Mixtape (DJ Mick Boogie) while the remix to "Beautiful Day" featured Big Pooh and Evidence of Dilated Peoples. In February 2009 to set the precedent for their second album “A Love Supreme” the duo released the mixtape "Before There was Love" (DJ Mick Boogie) featuring collabs with Talib Kweli, Aloe Blacc, Fashawn, Mickey Factz, Evidence, and Kes Kaos.

2009-2010
In February 2009 while promoting the debut LP A Love Supreme they were featured in UK's Dazed & Confused Magazine where music editor Tim Noakes said, “They are the youthful epitome of colour and cadence.”
In Summer 2009 they secured a record deal with Mountain Dew’s Green Label Sound for the release of the single “Land of the Kings.” Their music videos for "Beautiful Day," "Soul Hop" “Lately” f/ Miguel, “Windows,” “Black Sky” and “Land of the Kings” all went into rotation on MTV Jams, MTVu, Sucka Free and MTV2. In Fall 2009 they headed out on a successful nationwide tour with Warren G, Kidz in the Hall Curtains and Theo Martins.

In March 2010 they released the follow up to their LP A Love Supreme 2.0 which contained 5 new tracks as well as a remixes with Evidence, Bun B and Jive Recording R&B Artist Miguel

The duo have been credited with reviving the "true essence" of hip-hop, rejecting the Gangsta rap style that had become common. In 2007 Billboard Magazine said the duo were “born from the ashes of gangsta rap.”

Discography

Albums

Fried Chicken & Watermelon (2007)
 Introduction (1:23)
 The Launch (5:20)
 Soul Hop (3:49)
 Let Me BE (3:03)
 The Show 2007 (4:50)
 Do wit Me (4:06)
 Let Me Sing for You Skit (1:18)
 Knock on Wood (4:12)
 Fat Girl (4:41)
 The Proposal (4:03)
 Castlevania (3:55)
 LapDance (4:07)
 Beautiful Day (2:27)
 K.R.E.A.M. (4:49) (Samples C.R.E.A.M. by Wu-Tang Clan & Kick, Push by Lupe Fiasco)

Before There Was Love (2009)
 Mick Boogie Intro
 Cali Soul f/ Shawn Jackson and Hope (prod. by Dibia$e)
 See LA f/ Damani (prod. by Faahz)
 Cast' Em Out (prod. by Dibia$e)
 The Press Play Show Interlude Part 1
 On Tour f/ Bambu (prod. by Ro Blvd)
 Think About It f/6th Sense & Vandalyzm (prod. by 6th Sense)
 Half Off f/ Evidence
 Run Son f/ El Prez, 310, C-San, & Casey Veggies (prod. by Ro Blvd)
 Stakes Is High (prod. by 6th Sense)
 The Press Play Show Interlude Part 2
 Beautiful Day Remix f/ Big Pooh, Evidence, Aloe Blacc, Kes Kaos, Mickey Factz, Fashawn, & Theo Martins (prod. by Dibia$e))
 Yesterday (prod. by Ski Team)
 Hey Neighbor (prod. by Ro Blvd)
 Wildin' f/ Chen Lo & Tunji (prod. by Ro Blvd)
 The Press Play Show Interlude Part 3
 Castle Vee Re-Up f/ Black Milk (prod. by Dibia$e)
 Arcade Fly Remix f/ Wildabeast, 6th Sense, Buff1, Donny Goines, Fashawn
 Night Nurse (prod. by Cook Classics)
 Relax f/ Fashawn (prod. by FredNukes)
 Return f/Talib Kweli (prod. by Lee Bannon)
 Mainstream Consumers f/ Free Speech & Bambu (prod. by Ro Blvd)
 Monster f/ Shawn Jackson (prod. by Jaguar Skills)
 Vitamin B f/ CurT@!n$ (prod. by Lee Bannon)
 The Press Play Show Interlude Part 4
 Start My Day f/ H.O.P.E. (prod. by Ro Blvd)
 Herb f/Co$$ & Bad Lucc (prod. by Ro Blvd)

A Love Supreme (2009)
 My Life
 Windows
 Supreme
 Hollywood Hiatus
 Lately
 Pulp Fiction Part 1 (featuring Fashawn)
 The Grudge
 Voltron
 Stylin
 Hammertime
 Calendar Girls
 Lauren London
 Black Sky
 Halftime
 A Love Supreme

A Love Supreme 2.0 (2010)
 Supreme 2.0
 Land of the Kings
 Hollywood Hiatus
 The Launch 2.0
 Lately (featuring Miguel)
 My Life (featuring Kes Koas)
 Calendar Girls
 Stylin
 Windows
 Halftime
 Pulp Fiction (featuring Fashawn)
 P**y (featuring Evidence)
 The Grudge
 Land of the Kings (Remix) (featuring Bun B)
 Voltron
 HammerTime
 Lauren London
 Black Sky
 A Love Supreme

Singles

"Beautiful Day" (2007)
"Soul Hop" (2008)
"Hollywood Hiatus (Cool It Now)" (2008)
"Land of the Kings" (2009)
"Lately" f/ Miguel (2010)

See also
Los Angeles hip hop
Northwest hip hop

References

External links
Facebook
Official Blog

African-American musical groups
American musical duos
Hip hop duos
Hip hop record producers
Musical groups established in 2007
Hip hop groups from California
Musicians from Inglewood, California